Xue Feng (born February 6, 1965), a naturalized American citizen, is a geologist who worked for IHS Inc. and was sentenced to 8 years of prison by Chinese authorities for espionage. Dr. Xue was released and immediately deported to the U.S. on April 3, 2015, from the Beijing No.2 Prison after being incarcerated since November 20, 2007.

Life
Xue Feng was born on February 6, 1965, near the city of Xi'an in Shaanxi province in China. While pursuing a geology degree at Xi'an's Northwest University in the late 1980s and early 1990s, he acted as an interpreter and guide for visiting geologists. One geologist that he met, David Rowley, invited him to do his PhD at the University of Chicago.

While at the University of Chicago, Xue Feng worked on ultra-high-pressure metamorphism, a transformation that can be seen in rocks that have been to depths of 70 km or more. He graduated with a doctoral degree in geology.  He worked as the Northeast Asia manager for IHS Inc.

On Nov. 20, 2007, Xue was detained by Chinese authorities.  He was eventually charged with espionage. While in prison, he was tortured.

Xue Feng has a wife, Nan Kang, and two children.

Publications

See also
Stern Hu

References

Further reading

Living people
Espionage scandals and incidents
University of Chicago alumni
American torture victims
Chinese emigrants to the United States
Chinese prisoners and detainees
Chinese torture victims
American geologists
1965 births
People from Xi'an
People with acquired American citizenship
Scientists from Shaanxi